Darbid-e Hoseyn Ali (also Romanized as Dārbīd-e Ḩoseyn ʿAlī) is a village in Vizhenan Rural District, in the Central District of Gilan-e Gharb County, Kermanshah Province, Iran. At the 2006 census, its population was 32, in 6 families.

References 

Populated places in Gilan-e Gharb County